This is a roster of the bus fleet of Metrobus, the fixed-route bus service run by the Washington Metropolitan Area Transit Authority in Washington, D.C.

The Metrobus fleet is the sixth-largest bus fleet in the United States. It provides more than 130 million passenger trips per year in Washington, D.C., Maryland, and Virginia.

Current fleet
On July 4, 2018, WMATA awarded a 5-year contract to New Flyer for up to 694 buses, order consist of forty-foot CNG, forty-foot clean diesel, sixty-foot CNG, and sixty-foot diesel heavy-duty transit buses. These new buses will replace Metro's older New Flyer Low Floor buses, which were delivered between 2005 and 2007. Red/Silver painted buses will be used on local routes and Blue/Silver buses will be used on limited stop routes. These buses will have either "Local or "MetroExtra on the top of each side of the bus for easy identification.

WMATA is adding a total of 533 hybrid buses to replace its diesel bus fleet. Each new "New Flyer Xcelsior XDE40" bus costs $571,737 and is expected to break down less frequently as well as offer greater fuel economy. With the latest purchase of 152 hybrid buses for $89.3 million from New Flyer of America, WMATA's Metrobus fleet will consist of 297 diesel buses, 800 hybrid buses and 458 natural gas fueled buses. Additionally, WMATA placed an order for 110 new buses from New Flyer on September 18, 2019. An additional order of 132 buses from New Flyer were ordered on December 23, 2019.

Future fleet 
In 2020, WMATA received $4.1 million in funding from the Federal Transit Administration for the purchase of electric buses and charging infrastructure. A Sierra Club report indicated that a pilot study with 14 electric buses was planned, and estimated that 50% electrification by 2030 would reduce the WMATA fleet's greenhouse gas (GHG) emissions by more than 58,000 tons of carbon dioxide per year.

Retired fleet 
These buses were served by WMATA at one point but were replaced by newer and more efficient buses after serving at least 8 years. Some buses were preserved and some were acquired by museums while the rest of the fleets were scrapped.

Divisions

Closed divisions

References

External links 

:Metrobus (Washington, D.C.)

 
1967 establishments in Washington, D.C.
Bus transportation in Washington, D.C.
Bus transportation in Maryland
Bus transportation in Virginia